Karmanghat is a neighbourhood in Hyderabad, Telangana, India. It formed Ward No. 12 of Greater Hyderabad Municipal Corporation in 2009.

References 

Neighbourhoods in Hyderabad, India
Municipal wards of Hyderabad, India